Takae Itō may refer to:
 Takae Itō (Aichi Prefecture politician) (born 1975), Japanese politician
 Takae Itō (Hyōgo Prefecture politician) (born 1968), Japanese politician